id Software is an American video game developer based in Richardson, Texas. It was founded in February 1991 by four members of the software company Softdisk: programmers John Carmack and John Romero, game designer Tom Hall, and artist Adrian Carmack. The founders, along with business manager Jay Wilbur, had previously developed the 1990 PC game Commander Keen in Invasion of the Vorticons as "Ideas from the Deep" while still employees of Softdisk. After its founding, id developed further shareware computer games in the Commander Keen series for Apogee Software, as well as a series of small games for Softdisk, before releasing the "grandfather of first-person shooters", Wolfenstein 3D, in 1992 through both shareware and retail. It was followed by Doom (1993), considered one of the most significant and influential titles in video game history, which id self-published in shareware before releasing for retail through GT Interactive. GT Interactive published a sequel, Doom II (1994) and the two companies split publishing duties on id's final self-published or shareware game, Quake (1996).

The company has focused primarily on further computer and mobile games in the Doom and Quake series since 1993, with the addition of the Rage series: Rage: Mutant Bash TV (2010), Rage (2011), and Rage 2 (2019). Additionally, it co-developed a set of mobile phone games with Fountainhead Entertainment in 2005–2009, including Orcs & Elves (2006), Orcs & Elves II (2007), and Wolfenstein RPG (2008). It has released eight Doom games and five Quake titles in total. These games have been published through retail primarily by Activision, EA Mobile, and Bethesda Softworks. Additionally, id published three games in the Heretic series by Raven Software in 1994–1997, before ceasing its publishing operations. In 2009, id was purchased by ZeniMax Media, the parent company of Bethesda. The company's latest release is the first-person shooter Doom Eternal (2020).

Games

Published games
Shortly after the release of its sole self-published game, Doom, in 1993, id briefly moved into publishing works by other developers. The only titles it published were a trilogy of games by Raven Software, which use modified versions of game engines developed by id and featured id employees as producers. A fourth game, Strife, was briefly under development by Cygnus Studios and was to be published by id; after a few months it was cancelled. It was later finished by Rogue Entertainment and published by Velocity in 1996.

Notes

References

Sources
 

Video game lists by company